In computer science, a digital electronic computer is a computer machine which is both an electronic computer and a digital computer. Examples of digital electronic computers include the IBM PC, the Apple Macintosh, and modern smartphones. When computers that were both digital and electronic appeared, they displaced almost all other kinds of computers, but computation has historically been performed in various non-digital and non-electronic ways: the Lehmer sieve is an example of a digital non-electronic computer, while analog computers are examples of non-digital computers which can be electronic (with analog electronics), and mechanical computers are examples of non-electronic computers (which may be digital or not). 

An example of a computer which is both non-digital and non-electronic is the ancient Antikythera mechanism found in Greece. All kinds of computers, whether they are digital or analog, and electronic or non-electronic, can be Turing complete if they have sufficient memory. A digital electronic computer is not necessarily a programmable computer, a stored program computer, or a general purpose computer, since in essence a digital electronic computer can be built for one specific application and be non-reprogrammable. 

, most personal computers and smartphones in people's homes that use multicore central processing units (such as AMD FX, Intel Core i7, or the multicore varieties of ARM-based chips) are also parallel computers using the MIMD (multiple instruction, multiple data) paradigm, a technology previously only used in digital electronic supercomputers. , most digital electronic supercomputers are also cluster computers, a technology that can be used at home in the form of small Beowulf clusters. Parallel computation is also possible with non-digital or non-electronic computers. An example of a parallel computation system using the abacus would be a group of human computers using a number of abacus machines for computation and communicating using natural language.

A digital computer can perform its operations in the decimal system, in binary, in ternary or in other numeral systems. , all digital electronic computers commonly used, whether personal computers or server computers or supercomputers, are working in the binary number system and also use binary logic. A few ternary computers using ternary logic were built mainly in the Soviet Union as research projects.

A digital electronic computer is not necessarily a transistorized computer: before the advent of the transistor, computers used vacuum tubes. The transistor enabled electronic computers to become much more powerful, and recent and future developments in digital electronics may enable humanity to build even more powerful electronic computers. One such possible development is the memristor.

People living in the beginning of the 21st century use digital electronic computers for storing data, such as photos, music, documents, for performing complex mathematical computations, or for communication, commonly over a worldwide computer network called the internet which connects many of the world's computers. All these activities made possible by digital electronic computers could, in essence, be performed with non-digital or non-electronic computers if they were sufficiently powerful, but it was only the combination of electronics technology with digital computation in binary that enabled humanity to reach the computation power necessary for today's computing. Advances in quantum computing, DNA computing, optical computing or other technologies could lead to the development of more powerful computers in the future.

Digital computers are inherently best described by discrete mathematics, while analog computers are most commonly associated with continuous mathematics.

The philosophy of digital physics views the universe as being digital. Konrad Zuse wrote a book known as Rechnender Raum in which he described the whole universe as one all-encompassing computer.

See also
Abacus
ENIAC
EDVAC
List of vacuum tube computers
History of computing hardware
List of transistorized computers

Computers